Tricia Janine Helfer (born April 11, 1974) is a Canadian-American actress and former model. She played the enigmatic Cylon model Number Six in the re-imagined Battlestar Galactica series (2004–2009). She also voiced Sarah Kerrigan in StarCraft II and its expansion packs (2010–2015). She played Charlotte Richards/the Goddess of All Creation on the TV series Lucifer (2016–2021).

Early life
Helfer was born in rural Donalda, Alberta, Canada, to Dennis and Elaine Helfer. She is of German, English, Swedish and Norwegian descent.

She studied at William E. Hay Composite High School in Stettler, Alberta. She lived and worked on the family's grain farm with her three sisters: Trena, Tammy and Tara.

Helfer was discovered at age 17 by a modeling agency scout while standing in line at a movie theatre.

Career

Modelling

In 1992, she won Ford Models' Supermodel of the World contest. Helfer retired from fashion modelling in 2002 and claimed all her shoots since then are related to projects or product endorsements. She has appeared in ad campaigns for Ralph Lauren, Versace, Chanel, and Giorgio Armani.

Helfer has walked for top fashion shows, such as Carolina Herrera, Christian Dior, Claude Montana, Givenchy, John Galliano, and Dolce & Gabbana. Helfer has appeared on the covers of Flare, Amica, ELLE, Cosmopolitan, Marie Claire, and Vogue, among others. She also regularly appeared in photo shoots by Maxim magazine, was the magazine's wall calendar girl for 2005, and was ranked #57 on the Maxims Hot 100 Women of 2007. Helfer was also featured as the cover model for the February 2007 issue of Playboy.

Acting

Helfer relocated to Los Angeles in 2002 to pursue a full-time acting career. Her first acting assignment was a co-starring role as Sarah on the television series Jeremiah. She later played a model named Ashleigh James on the May 16, 2002, episode of CSI: Crime Scene Investigation ("The Hunger Artist"). In 2002, she played "Eva" in the independent film White Rush.

In 2003, she played Number Six on Battlestar Galactica. In 2004, she portrayed Farrah Fawcett in the telefilm Behind the Camera: The Unauthorized Story of Charlie's Angels. Concurrent with her role in Battlestar Galactica, Helfer began producing and hosting Canada's Next Top Model on May 31, 2006. She appeared in Spiral and The Green Chain later the same year.

In October 2006, it was announced that Helfer would not return to host the second season of Canada's Next Top Model so she could concentrate on Battlestar Galactica. Helfer also played a major role in Electronic Arts Command & Conquer 3: Tiberium Wars, as the high-level Nod general Kilian Qatar, along with her Battlestar Galactica co-star, actress Grace Park. She also starred in the episode "Roadkill" on the second season of Supernatural.

Helfer had a recurring role on CBS' Two and a Half Men. She played Gail, best friend of Charlie's (Charlie Sheen) fiancée Chelsea (Jennifer Taylor). When Chelsea finds out that her friend is recovering from a breakup, she says she should do so at Charlie's house. Shortly after Chelsea and Charlie begin a trial separation, Gail begins a sexual relationship with Charlie.

Battlestar Galactica

In 2003, the television series Battlestar Galactica was used as the basis for a three-hour miniseries on the Sci Fi channel. The project was written and produced by Ronald D. Moore and directed by Michael Rymer. Helfer played the role of Number Six, a humanoid Cylon operative. She continued that role as a regular cast member in the TV series, which completed its fourth and final season on March 20, 2009. Due to the special nature of the Number Six character – there are many "copies" of Number Six with distinct personalities – Helfer has, in effect, played numerous roles on the series. In 2009, she reprised her role as Number Six in Battlestar Galactica: The Plan – a television movie that tells the story of the series from the Cylons' point of view. In 2012, she voiced a prototype Cylon in the prequel Battlestar Galactica: Blood & Chrome.

Awards:
Leo Awards, Best Lead Performance By A Female in a Dramatic Series, Tricia Helfer ("Pegasus")

Nominations:
Scream Awards, Breakout Performance, Tricia Helfer as Number Six
Scream Awards, Best Television Actress, Tricia Helfer

2008–present

In August 2008, Helfer appeared on the stage of NVISION 08, an event sponsored by NVIDIA, where she discussed her role in Battlestar Galactica as well as the use of computer graphics on the show. Helfer appeared in an episode of the NBC series Chuck, and as Michael Westen's nemesis in the USA Network series Burn Notice as "Carla Baxter". She appears as herself in Old 97's music video for their song, "Dance with Me".

She guest starred in "Resonance", the second episode of Warehouse 13 as FBI Agent Bonnie Belski on Syfy. She made a guest appearance in the pilot episode of Fox's 2009 mid-season series Human Target. She has played several prominent video game roles in recent years; including Kilian Quatar in Command & Conquer 3: Tiberium Wars, Veronica Dare in Halo 3: ODST and EDI, the artificial intelligence aboard the Normandy SR-2 in Mass Effect 2 and Mass Effect 3. She voices Sarah Kerrigan in StarCraft II: Wings of Liberty and the expansion sets Heart of the Swarm and Legacy of the Void. Helfer voices Black Cat in The Spectacular Spider-Man and reprised her role in Spider-Man: Web of Shadows.

Helfer joined the cast of Jerry Bruckheimer's TNT drama, Dark Blue, as FBI Special Agent Alex Rice. The show was cancelled in November 2010 because of low ratings. In October 2010, she made a guest appearance on Lie to Me.

In 2011, she starred in The Black Keys' music video for "Howlin' for You". She made guest appearances in No Ordinary Family (2011), and Franklin & Bash (2011). In 2011, Helfer starred as Morgana, a necromancer, in the TV series pilot 17th Precinct from Ron Moore with Galactica's co-stars James Callis and Jamie Bamber. In October 2011, she got the lead role in the TV pilot Scent of the Missing as Susannah, a K-9 Search and Rescue Volunteer. In November 2011, she appeared in the Hallmark TV movie Mistletoe Over Manhattan. For 2012, she signed for the recurring role of Alex Clark in the new NBC TV Series The Firm. On May 16, 2012, she appeared in season seven of the CBS series Criminal Minds, in which she led a team of bank-robbing serial killers. She guest starred in the second season of the Jane Espenson web series, Husbands.

In 2014, she played Molly Parker on ABC's Killer Women, a remake of the Argentinian drama Mujeres Asesinas, with producer Sofia Vergara. Also in 2014, she played Viondra Denniger, the steward and captain's wife of the titular starship in the miniseries Ascension on its long journey carrying people to populate a new world. Helfer voiced Sonya Blade in the fighting game, Mortal Kombat X, which was released in April 2015.

In 2015, she appeared in the series finale of Falling Skies as the Espheni Queen, the leader of the alien race that had invaded Earth and devastated humanity. She also played Louise, a woman attending a doll convention, in the web series Con Man.

In 2016, Helfer was added to the main cast for the second season of the Fox series Lucifer, playing the vessel of the titular character's mother.

In 2015–16, she played a recurring role as Evan Smith, a corporate attorney in the USA network series Suits.

In 2019, she was added to the main cast for the fourth season of the SyFy series Van Helsing, playing Dracula, the Dark One, who is the ruler of the vampire species.

Personal life
In 2003, Helfer married Jonathan Marshall, a lawyer whom she met at a mutual friend's birthday party. They separated in May 2017 and Helfer filed for divorce in January 2018, citing irreconcilable differences. The divorce was settled in 2019.

In 2011, Helfer became an American citizen.

She has four artificial discs in her back and two in her neck, resulting from an incident in which a piece of luggage was dropped on her head while sitting on a commercial airliner, and two in her lower back from mishaps while doing her own stunts. 

She co-founded the charity web site "Acting Outlaws" with former Battlestar Galactica co-star Katee Sackhoff, which collects donations for several causes and charity events. She is also involved in various causes, from animal rescue to the oil spill in the Gulf of Mexico. In 2014, she appeared in a PETA video campaign, encouraging cat owners to keep their pets indoors.

Helfer is a vegetarian.

Filmography

Film

Television

Video games

References

External links

official tricia helfer instagram
  
 

1974 births
Living people
20th-century Canadian actresses
21st-century Canadian actresses
Actresses from Alberta
Canadian film actresses
Canadian people of English descent
Canadian people of German descent
Canadian people of Norwegian descent
Canadian people of Swedish descent
Canadian television actresses
Canadian video game actresses
Canadian voice actresses
Female models from Alberta
People from the County of Stettler No. 6
People with acquired American citizenship
Spike Video Game Award winners